Sharon F. McMurtry (formerly Remer; born October 31, 1960) is an American retired soccer player and was a member of the United States women's national soccer team from 1985 to 1986. She was the first recipient of the U.S. Soccer Female Athlete of the Year award in 1985.

McMurtry was raised in Bothell, Washington, and attended Inglemoor High School, where she played volleyball and basketball, in addition to soccer on the boys' team. She was also a member of the Tacoma Cozars club team. At Seattle University, she played basketball for the Redhawks, not soccer. After one year of college, she dropped out to pursue a short-lived semi-professional basketball career in the Netherlands. She later played and coached in Australia.

In 2016, McMurtry was included in the Top 50 Women Players ranking by Washington Youth Soccer.

See also
 1985 United States women's national soccer team

References

Further reading
 Grainey, Timothy (2012), Beyond Bend It Like Beckham: The Global Phenomenon of Women's Soccer, University of Nebraska Press, 
 Lisi, Clemente A. (2010), The U.S. Women's Soccer Team: An American Success Story, Scarecrow Press, 
 Nash, Tim (2016), ''It's Not the Glory: The Remarkable First Thirty Years of US Women's Soccer', Lulu Press, 

1960 births
Living people
United States women's international soccer players
Seattle University alumni
Soccer players from Washington (state)
People from Bothell, Washington
Women's association football midfielders
American women's soccer players
Seattle Redhawks athletes
American women's basketball players
Basketball players from Washington (state)
American expatriate basketball people in the Netherlands
American expatriate basketball people in Australia
21st-century American women